USTH may stand for:

 University of Santo Tomas Hospital, a hospital in Manila, Philippines
 University of Science and Technology of Hanoi, a university in Hanoi, Vietnam